Van Lear is an unincorporated community in Washington County, Maryland, United States. The community is part of the Hagerstown-Martinsburg, MD-WV MSA (Metropolitan Statistical Area). Van Lear is located between Halfway and Williamsport.

History

The Community of Van Lear was started in the late 1960s when a Hagerstown real estate agent, Lee Downey, started to sell tracts of his then rural land to developers. By the 1980s the Hagerstown area started to boom, so Downey made Van Lear Manor and Tammany Manor, the first two suburban neighborhoods in Van Lear.

Today

Today, Van Lear is a diverse residential mix of new and old, modern and historic, all side-by-side. In Van Lear's newer neighborhoods, larger modern homes are common.

Neighborhoods
 Van Lear Manor, the largest and first neighborhood.
 Tammany, another older neighborhood.
 Homewood, a housing complex for senior citizens.
 New Van Lear, a newer, somewhat large neighborhood filled with newer homes.
 Sterling Oaks, a new subdivision with middle to lower income housing.
 Bratton Hill, a small, new neighborhood with newer homes.
 New Tammany, a new middle-class neighborhood.

Sources

All of the information provided has been used with permission from the Van Lear Community Association.

Unincorporated communities in Washington County, Maryland
Unincorporated communities in Maryland